Nathair Facula is a bright region on the surface of Mercury, located at 36° N, 295.5° W.  It was named by the IAU in 2018.  Nathair is the Irish word for snake.

In the center of the region is an irregular depression with crisp topography, surrounded by a region of subdued features.  It is interpreted to be the site of explosive volcanic eruptions.  Hollows have formed within the depression.  The facula is approximately 270 km wide, although the edges are diffuse.

Nathair Facula is located northeast of the prominent Rachmaninoff crater, west of Copland crater, and east of the smaller Neidr Facula.

Views

References

Surface features of Mercury